is a Japanese actor. Matsuda is best known for his roles in the Hana Yori Dango series, the Liar Game series, and Love Shuffle.

Personal life
Matsuda was born on September 10, 1985 in Suginami, Tokyo, Japan, to Yūsaku Matsuda, a Japanese actor of partial Korean ancestry, and Miyuki Matsuda (née Kumagai). Matsuda was the second son and second child born of his parents' marriage. He has an older brother, Ryuhei Matsuda, who is also an actor, and a younger sister by his parents' marriage and one older half-sister by his father's first marriage. His father died in 1989 from bladder cancer, when Matsuda was 4 years old.

Matsuda's maternal aunt, Mami Kumagai, is also an actress. Matsuda's sister-in-law is British-Japanese model Mala Morgan, who is married to his older brother Ryuhei.

Matsuda directed Radio Foundation's music video "Brain Washing" as a tribute to their lead vocalist, Kenma Miyaoku, who died from a heart attack on July 12, 2009.

Filmography

Drama

TV Film

Film

Video games

Awards

|-
| rowspan = "2"| 2008
| Ikigami
| Nikkan Sports Film Awards: Yujiro Ishihara New Actor Award
| 
|-
| Waruboro
| Mainichi Film Awards: Sponichi Grand Prize New Talent Award
| 
|-
| rowspan = "2"| 2009
| Ikigami
| 32nd Japan Academy Prize: Newcomer of the Year
| 
|-
| Hana Yori Dango Final
| Asian Film Awards: Best Newcomer
| 
|}

References

External links
  

1985 births
21st-century Japanese male actors
Japanese male actors of Korean descent
Japanese male film actors
Japanese male television actors
Japanese people of Korean descent
Living people
Male actors from Tokyo
People from Suginami